Michael Glenn Thorne (born September 25, 1940) is an American politician who was a member of the Oregon State Senate.

A native of Pendleton, Oregon, he is a wheat farmer and real estate broker. He was director of the Port of Portland from 1991 to 2001 and director and chief executive officer of the Washington State Ferry System from 2002 to 2004.

References

1940 births
Living people
Democratic Party Oregon state senators
Politicians from Pendleton, Oregon
Farmers from Oregon
American real estate businesspeople
Port of Portland (Oregon)